Maginn Park is a football stadium located in Buncrana, County Donegal, Republic of Ireland. It is used by the amateur Inishowen Football League for staging cup finals and other important matches. During the 2017 League of Ireland season, the ground served as the temporary home of Derry City.

Derry City
Derry City played their home games at Maginn Park from the beginning of the 2017 season, due to renovation works at the Brandywell Stadium, Derry, Northern Ireland. The first League of Ireland match at the ground, against Limerick in March 2017, was abandoned after 25 minutes due to floodlight failure and torrential rain. The final match in October 2017 was a 1-1 draw against St. Patrick’s Athletic.

References

Derry City F.C.
Association football venues in the Republic of Ireland
Buncrana
Sports venues in County Donegal